Zinga is a town on the Oubangui River in the Central African Republic.  The town stretches roughly 1 km long and 300 m wide. It is known for its wooden buildings and as a ferry port, from which boats sail to Bangui and Brazzaville.

The town's French colonial history is exemplified by the remnants of a 6 km long railway that was built in the 1920s, connecting Zinga and Mongo.  It was added to the UNESCO World Heritage Tentative List on April 11, 2006 in the Cultural category.

See also 
History of rail transport in the Central African Republic

References 

Populated places in Lobaye